Hohepa Joe Rātima (birth unknown) is a New Zealand rugby union and professional rugby league footballer who played representative rugby league (RL) for New Zealand.

Rugby union career
Rātima is from Ngāti Maniapoto and originally played rugby union, representing King Country Rugby Union. He also represented New Zealand Māori.

Rugby league career
He then switched to rugby league, representing Auckland. In 1956 he was part of the Auckland sides that defeated Great Britain 5–4 in 1954 and France 17–15 in 1955.

In 1956 he toured Australia as part of the New Zealand Māori rugby league team.

He was part of the Ponsonby team that won the Auckland Rugby League title in 1958.

He represented New Zealand, playing in two tests against Great Britain in 1958 and then touring Australia in 1959.

Later years
Rātima was later the vice president of the Māori Rugby League organisation.

References

Auckland rugby league team players
King Country rugby union players
Living people
Māori All Blacks players
New Zealand Māori rugby league team players
New Zealand national rugby league team players
New Zealand rugby league players
New Zealand rugby union players
Ngāti Maniapoto people
Ponsonby Ponies players
Rugby league props
Year of birth missing (living people)